The Texas Education Agency (TEA) is the branch of the government of Texas responsible for public education in Texas in the United States. The agency is headquartered in the William B. Travis State Office Building in downtown Austin. Mike Morath, formerly a member of the Dallas Independent School District's board of trustees, was appointed commissioner of education by Texas Gov. Greg Abbott on Dec. 14, 2015, and began serving on Jan. 4, 2016.

History
Prior to the late 1940s, many school districts in Texas did not operate schools, but spent money to send children to schools operated by other districts. In the late 1940s, state lawmakers passed a bill abolishing those districts, prompting a wave of mass school district consolidation.

Duties
TEA is responsible for the oversight of public primary and secondary education in the state of Texas, involving over 1,000 individual school districts in the state and charter schools. It is also responsible for the safety of students. However, it does not have any jurisdiction over private or parochial schools (whether or not accredited) nor over home schools.

Although school districts are independent governmental entities, TEA has the authority to oversee a district's operations (either involving an individual school or the entire district) if serious issues arise (such as poor standardized test performance, financial distress, or mismanagement). This can be in the form of requiring the district to submit corrective action plans and regular status reports, assigning monitors to oversee operations (including the authority to assign a management board, which essentially replaces and performs the duties of the elected school board), and in extreme cases closure of a school campus or even the entire school district.

The University Interscholastic League (UIL), which oversees academic and athletic interscholastic competition in Texas public schools, is a separate entity not under TEA oversight.

In addition to primary and secondary education, TEA has oversight duties with respect to driver's education courses (initial permits) and defensive driving courses (used to have a ticket dismissed and/or for lower insurance premiums).

Curriculum controversies

On November 7, 2007, Christine Comer resigned as the director of the science curriculum after more than nine years. Comer said that her resignation was a result of pressure from officials who claimed that she had given the appearance of criticizing the teaching of intelligent design.

In 2009, the board received criticism from more than 50 scientific organizations over an attempt to weaken science standards on evolution.

In 2010, a group of historians, including Jean A. Stuntz of West Texas A&M University in Canyon, Texas, signed a petition to oppose the revisions in the social studies curricula approved by the state board, changes which require the inclusion of conservative topics in public school instruction. For instance, Jefferson's name must be restored to a list of Enlightenment thinkers. There must be emphasis on the Fifth Amendment to the Constitution of the United States in regard to property rights. Students must be taught that new documents and the Venona project verify U.S. Senator Joseph R. McCarthy's suspicions of communist infiltration. Stuntz told the Amarillo Globe-News that the SBOE is "micromanaging. They don't know what they're doing."

In October 2012, The Revisionaries, a documentary film about the re-election of the chairman of the Texas Board of Education Don McLeroy and the curriculum controversy, was released. In late January 2013, PBS's Independent Lens aired an abridged version the film.

Texas House Speaker Joe Straus of San Antonio, Texas said that the government should "take a look" at the structure of the board and consider a nonpartisan or appointed board if the elected members are "not getting their job done and they're not pleasing the Legislature or the citizens, then we ought to take) a thorough look at what they are doing." In 2010, it was said to be "drafting its own version of American history", including altering school textbooks to remove what it said was a "left-leaning bias" and making changes that are said to have "religious and racial overtones".

For example, the proposed curriculum would downplay Thomas Jefferson's emphasis on the separation of church and state (outlined in his Letter to Danbury Baptists), and would include a greater emphasis on the importance of religion to the founding fathers. Other changes include downplaying Abraham Lincoln's role in the civil war and putting more emphasis on the Confederate leader Jefferson Davis, questioning the Civil Rights Movement in addition to downplaying Martin Luther King Jr.'s legacy, removing such instances and points of history such as downplaying slavery, putting more emphasis on the states’ rights cause during the Civil War.  Critics of the proposed changes believe that such a focus on the religious elements of the founding period could cause teachers to omit lessons on history more pertinent to national standards.

Special education controversies 
A series of reports in 2016 from the Houston Chronicle found that since at least 2004, TEA denied special education services to thousands of students, prompting a federal investigation. State education officials set an arbitrary limit of 8.5% for the number of students who could receive special education services. By strictly enforcing district compliance with the benchmark, the rate of students receiving special education in Texas fell to 8.5% in 2015, far below the national average of 13%. School districts implemented a wide range of practices to reduce the number of students, including cutting services for certain children with autism and dyslexia, refusing to conduct eligibility evaluations in other languages, and refusing to accept medical records from other countries. Students who are English Language Learners (ELL) also faced a disproportionate impact resulting in a 20% difference in the rate of ELL students getting special education services compared to native speakers. In Houston ISD, the state's largest school district, after the 8.5% goal was met the standard was lowered to 8%. As a result, the district cut hundreds of special education positions, postponed diagnostic evaluations to second grade, and created a list of disqualifying factors that keep students from getting services.

TEA issued a no-bid contract for $4.4 million to SPEDx in 2017 to analyze student records to assist with the overhaul of its special education practices. Advocates raised concerns about the lack of a competitive bidding process and the Georgia-based company's qualifications, and a former TEA special education director filed a federal complaint about TEA violating state procurement processes.

In 2018, the U.S. Department of Education found that "Texas violated federal law by failing to ensure students with disabilities were properly evaluated and provided with an adequate public education." A multi-year strategic plan was released in 2018. In a grant application to the agency, TEA stated that they will not be able to ensure adequate services for special education students until June 2020.

In September 2020, in the midst of several attempts to place Houston ISD under state control, TEA investigators recommended a state-appointed conservator be selected to oversee the district.

Commissioner of education
The current commissioner of education is Mike Morath. A former member of the Dallas Independent School District's board of trustees, he was appointed commissioner of education by Texas Gov. Greg Abbott on Dec. 14, 2015.

The commissioner's role is to lead and manage the Texas Education Agency. The commissioner also co-ordinates efforts between state and federal agencies.

State Board of Education
TEA is overseen by a 15-member State Board of Education, elected from single-member districts for four years.

The board devises policies and sets academic standards for Texas public schools, and oversees the state Permanent School Fund and selects textbooks to be used in Texas schools.

Since 2011, the board can still recommend textbooks, but public school districts can order their own books and materials even if their selections are not on the state-approved list. So far, most districts have continued to follow the state-endorsed textbooks, but that trend is expected to change in the next two years as the districts become more cognizant of their available options. Thomas Ratliff, a moderate Republican and the son of former Lieutenant Governor Bill Ratliff of Mount Pleasant, in 2010 unseated the Bryan dentist Don McLeroy, a former education board chairman who was the leader of the conservative bloc. Ratliff said in 2013 that the board is "far different" in political complexion that it was in 2010. Though the Republicans hold 9 of the 15 seats, social conservatives are no longer in the majority.

After redistricting in 2021, all 15 seats will be up for re-election in 2022. Seven members will be randomly chosen to serve a two-year term to return to the previous staggered format.

Regions

To serve the large number of individual school districts and charter schools in Texas, TEA is divided into 20 regions, each containing an educational service center (sometimes called regional service center).

School and district accountability

Education performance rating
TEA rates schools and districts using the same four criteria.   According to the TEA, the number of state schools and districts receiving the top ratings of "exemplary" and "recognized" increased from 2,213 in 2005 to 3,380 in 2006. In 2020, all schools were given a "not rated" designator due to the COVID-19 pandemic.

Gold Performance acknowledgements
In addition to the state ranking, districts and schools can be awarded additional commendations (referred to as Gold Performance acknowledgements) for other noteworthy accomplishments not included in the ranking system.

Budget and enrollment

The Texas Education Agency is funded by the people of the State of Texas, at the direction of their elected legislature and with the consent of the Governor of Texas.  The agency's budget must be approved on the legislature's biannual schedule.  Revenues for the agency come from the state general fund (primarily sales taxes), the federal government, the Permanent School Fund (a sovereign wealth fund created by the state with revenues from public lands), and other sources.

 - Budget figure is projection; all other years are actual expenditure as reported by TEA

References

https://tea.texas.gov/about-tea/leadership/state-board-of-education/sboe-board-members/sboe-member-district-8

External links

 
 
 Texas Education Agency recipient profile on USAspending.gov

 
Education Agency, Texas
Education Agency, Texas
State departments of education of the United States
Government agencies established in 1949
1949 establishments in Texas